Kato Komi is a village and a community of the Kozani municipality. Before the 2011 local government reform it was part of the municipality of Elimeia, of which it was a municipal district. The 2011 census recorded 288 inhabitants in the community. The community of Kato Komi covers an area of 8.202 km2.

See also
List of settlements in the Kozani regional unit

References

Populated places in Kozani (regional unit)